Raymonde Godin (born 1930) is a Canadian artist.

Originally from Quebec, she moved to France in 1954 and lives in the Drôme Provençale. Godin was included in a 2020 exhibit, Women in the 1950s. Through Abstraction, Painting and Sculpture, at the Soulages Museum.

Her work is included in the collections of the Musée national des beaux-arts du Québec and the National Gallery of Canada.

References

Living people
1930 births
20th-century Canadian women artists
21st-century Canadian women artists